The Thorpe Cup is an annual international decathlon and heptathlon meeting between the United States and Germany.

First held in 1993 in Aachen, the 2009 and 2010 events were staged at the Georg-Gaßmann-Stadion in Marburg. The meeting is named after the famous Olympian Jim Thorpe.

Tom Pappas holds the meeting record with 8569 points scored at the 2009 event.

References

External links 

 Zehnkampfteam.de – Germany's decathlon team 
 2010 results at leichtathletik.de
 Steele Named 2010 USA Decathlon Coach
 Deutsche Zehnkämpfer gewinnen Thorpe Cup 

Annual track and field meetings
Athletics competitions in Germany
Track and field competitions in the United States
Recurring sporting events established in 1993
Combined events competitions